As per the Asian Development Bank's estimates of 2017, 5.4% of the population of Azerbaijan lives below the poverty line. In the same ADB report, it was estimated that for every 1000 babies born in Azerbaijan, 23 die before their fifth birthday.

Baku
It has often been stated that the revenue from the petroleum resources of Azerbaijan benefited Baku, while the rest of the country remained under developed.

References 

Azerbaijan
Economy of Azerbaijan